Murphy's Romance is a 1985 American romantic-comedy film directed by Martin Ritt. The screenplay by Harriet Frank Jr. and Irving Ravetch was based on the 1980 novella by Max Schott. The film stars Sally Field, James Garner, Brian Kerwin, and Corey Haim, and was produced by Laura Ziskin for Field's production company Fogwood Films.

The film's theme song, "Love for the Last Time", is performed by Carole King.

Plot summary
Emma Moriarty is a 33-year-old, divorced mother who moves to a rural Arizona town to make a living by training and boarding horses. She becomes friends with the town's pharmacist, Murphy Jones, an idiosyncratic widower. A romance between them seems unlikely because of Murphy's age and because Emma allows her ex-husband, Bobby Jack Moriarty , to move back in with her and their 12-year-old son Jake.

Emma struggles to make ends meet, but is helped by Murphy. While refusing to help her outright with charity or personal loan, Murphy gives a part-time job to Jake and buys a horse with her assistance, boarding it with Emma and encouraging others to do the same. He also provides emotional support for Emma and Jake.

A rivalry develops between Murphy and Bobby Jack, who is immature and dishonest. Emma and Murphy fall in love despite Bobby Jack's efforts to hamper their romance. Bobby Jack finally leaves town after an 18-year-old  he had a fling with appears at the ranch with their newborn twin sons. With him gone, Murphy and Emma are free to pursue a relationship.

Cast

Production
Sally Field and director Martin Ritt had to fight Columbia Pictures in order to cast Garner, who was viewed at that point as primarily a television actor despite having enjoyed a flourishing film career in the 1960s and having co-starred in the box-office hit Victor/Victoria in 1982.

Columbia did not want to make the picture at all because it had no "sex or violence" in it. However, Columbia agreed because of the success of Norma Rae (1979), with the same star (Field), director, and screenwriting team (Harriet Frank Jr. and Irving Ravetch), and with Field's new production company Fogwood Films producing. Columbia then wanted Marlon Brando, or someone with "greater box-office allure", to play the part of Murphy, so Field and Ritt had to insist on Garner.

When Ritt gave the Max Schott story to Harriet Frank Jr. and Irving Ravetch, the same married screenplay team that worked on Hud (1963) with Ritt and Paul Newman, they wanted Newman to be in Murphy's Romance. Field had worked successfully with Newman in 1981's Absence of Malice, but Newman declined the project, and Garner was the only other actor that Ritt and Field had asked.

Part of the deal from the studio, which at that time was owned by The Coca-Cola Company, included an eight-line sequence of Field and Garner saying the word "Coke", and having Coke products and signs appear prominently in the film.

On the A&E television program Biography of Garner, "James Garner: Hollywood Maverick", Field reported that her on-screen kiss with Garner was the best cinematic kiss she had experienced.

Filming took place on location in Florence, Arizona, and the town's preserved Main Street appears throughout the movie.

The film was scheduled for general release during the weekend for 1985 Christmas Day, but Columbia moved it to the weekends of January 17 and January 31, 1986, to avoid competing with the holiday lineup of films. It did a limited, selected, release for the film on December 25, 1985, so that it would qualify for that year's Academy Awards.

The screenplay is very different from the Max Schott novella. In the Schott story, Murphy and Emma stay just platonic friends. Murphy marries someone else, and then tries to find Emma a suitable husband.

The film was one of the final titles to be released on the now defunct CED Videodisc format in 1986.

Reception
Reviews were generally favorable. Film critic Roger Ebert gave the film 3 stars (out of 4), stating "Much depends on exactly what Emma and Murphy say to each other, and how they say it, and what they don't say. The movie gets it all right." The film holds a rating of 74% on review-aggregation website Rotten Tomatoes, based on 27 reviews.

Awards and honors
Murphy's Romance received Academy Award nominations for Best Actor in a Leading Role (James Garner) and for Best Cinematography (William A. Fraker).

In 2002, the film was nominated by the American Film Institute for 
AFI's 100 Years...100 Passions.

References

External links
 
 
 
 
 
 James Garner interview on the Charlie Rose Show
 James Garner interview at the Archive of American Television

1985 films
1985 romantic comedy films
American romantic comedy films
1980s English-language films
Films directed by Martin Ritt
Films set in Florence, Arizona
Films shot in Arizona
Columbia Pictures films
Films based on American novels
1980s American films